Yuen Long Nullah is a nullah across western Yuen Long, Hong Kong. It starts off as a stream west of Tai Tong and flows north into Yuen Long Town. It then changes course to the northeast and connects with Shan Pui River.

See also
List of rivers and nullahs in Hong Kong

References
2007. 2007 Hong Kong Map. Easy Finder Ltd.

External links
Yuen Long Nullah below Long Ping KCR station
Rivers of Hong Kong (as Tin Tsuen Channel) (in Chinese)

Rivers of Hong Kong
Yuen Long